Palma-Palmilla, also known as District 5, is one of the 11 districts of the city of Málaga, Spain. 

It comprises the wards (barrios) of 26 de Febrero, 503 Viviendas, Arroyo de los Ángeles, Huerta La Palma, La Palma, La Palmilla, La Roca, La Rosaleda, Las Virreinas, Martiricos, Parque Las Virreinas, Virreina, and Virreina Alta.

References

External links

 Málaga Council official website
 Aerial pictures of Palma-Palmilla

Districts of Málaga